Today's Bradshaw Trail is a historic overland stage route in the western Colorado Desert of Southern California.  It is a remnant of the much longer Bradshaw Road, also known as the Road to La Paz, or Gold Road, established in 1862 by William D. Bradshaw.  It was the first overland route to connect the gold fields near La Paz in the U.S. New Mexico Territory, later the Arizona Territory, to Southern California's more populated west coast.  Once in La Paz, additional roads provided access to the mining districts of the central New Mexico/Arizona Territory, near Wickenburg and Prescott.

The route ran from San Bernardino, California, through the San Gorgonio Pass and Coachella Valley, past the Salton Sink (now filled by the Salton Sea), and east to the Colorado River where Bradshaw's Ferry was available to transport travelers across the river. The gold fields were then some 5 miles northeast of current-day Ehrenberg, Arizona.

History 
The trail is named for trailblazer William D. Bradshaw, who first crossed the area in 1862. A former forty-niner, Bradshaw knew that the northern gold mines were rapidly becoming exhausted and that the flood of refugees from the area would need a more direct trail from the south across the desert to the new strike at La Paz. Without a direct trail, it would be necessary to travel a great distance southeast to Yuma, then north up the river to La Paz. Bradshaw was also aware of the financial possibilities that could be found in a gold boomtown. In May 1862, Bradshaw and eight other men set out to find a direct route to La Paz.

Bradshaw and his party traveled southeast through Agua Caliente, now Palm Springs, and then South to a village where the Torres Martinez Indian Reservation is now located. There Bradshaw was befriended by Cabazon, a chief of the Cahuilla Indians of the Salton Sink, and a Maricopa from Arizona who was visiting the Cahuilla villages. They provided Bradshaw with the knowledge of the route of their ancient trade route through the Colorado Desert, including the location of springs and water holes.

Armed with this information, Bradshaw traveled eastward near present-day Mecca at the northern tip of the Salton Sink, to Bitter Spring at the foothills of the Orocopia Mountains and on 5 miles to an existing stage stop called "Dos Palmas Spring."  Leaving Dos Palmas, the men continued through the pass eastward between the Orocopia and Chocolate mountain ranges, briefly skirting the southern end of the Chuckwalla range, crossed through a gap in the Mule Mountains and reaching the Palo Verde Valley two miles southwest of the modern community of Ripley. Despite the fact that the trail crossed mostly barren desert, water was reasonably plentiful with water holes found at roughly  intervals at Canyon Springs, Tabaseca Tanks, Chuckwalla Springs and Mule Spring.

Crossing the Palo Verde Valley to the northwest, they crossed a slough of the Colorado River called Laguna, and Willow Springs Station, to Bradshaw's Ferry, the crossing point of the Colorado River to Mineral City east of what is now Blythe.  Once they crossed the Colorado River, the party rode upstream for approximately five miles to the gold fields of La Paz.

Between 1862 and 1877, the Bradshaw Trail was the main stagecoach and wagon route between Southern California and the gold fields of La Paz and other places in western Arizona.  The La Paz - Wikenburg Road connected the Bradshaw Trail to the interior of Arizona Territory and the mining districts there.  Olive City was the first Bradshaw ferry crossing for the trail from 1862 to 1864.  With the founding of Mineral City, which became the new Bradshaw ferry crossing, Mineral City became part of Ehrenberg when it was established in 1866.  From 1870 the trail ended and connected with the toll road to Wickenburg at Ehrenberg as La Paz, became a ghost town when its mines played out.

The trail today 
Use of a four wheel drive vehicle is recommended to traverse the trail, and no amenities may be found on the trail itself.

Another consideration is the Chocolate Mountain Aerial Gunnery Range which borders a part of the Bradshaw Trail to the south.  This is a live bombing range and is clearly posted as such.

See also

 List of Riverside County, California, placename etymologies#Bradshaw
 Wiley's Well

References

Bibliography
 Gunther, Jane Davies. Riverside County, California, Place Names; Their Origins and Their Stories, Riverside, CA, 1984. .
 Wheeler, G.M. & Bergland Eric, 1875, Topographical Sketch showing the Outward and Inward Route of a Party, while examining as to the practicability of a Diversion of the Colorado River for Purposes of Irrigation, Lithograph by Eric Bergland, 1875. From, Wheeler, G.M., Topographical Atlas Projected To Illustrate United States Geographical Surveys West Of The 100th Meridian Of Longitude Prosecuted In Accordance With Acts Of Congress Under The Authority Of The Honorable The Secretary Of War, And The Direction Of Brig. Genl. A.A. Humphreys, Chief Of Engineers, U.S. Army. Embracing Results Of the Different Expeditions Under The Command Of 1st Lieut. Geo. M. Wheeler, Corps Of Engineers. Julius Bien, lith., G. Thompson, Washington, 1876 from davidrumsey.com accessed December 3, 2014.]  Shows the Colorado River above Ehrenburg, Arizona to Stones Ferry at the mouth of the Virgin River, in Southern California, parts of Nevada, and Arizona.  Includes the roads and railroads of the time, including the detailed routes of the Bradshaw Trail and the Mojave Road.  From a Wheeler Annual Report.  Gift to the David Rumsey collection by Mark Sappington.

Citations and notes

Further reading
 
 Reviewed in 
  (for more information about Dos Palmas Spring)

External links 

 BLM page on the Bradshaw Trail outlining recreational activities and access information
 Bradshaw Trail history at desertusa.com

 
1862 establishments in California
Geography of La Paz County, Arizona
Transportation in Riverside County, California
Transportation in San Bernardino County, California
Colorado Desert
San Gorgonio Pass
Coachella Valley
Lower Colorado River Valley
State Scenic Highway System (California)
Historic trails and roads in California
Historic trails and roads in Arizona
Transportation in Imperial County, California
Bureau of Land Management Back Country Byways